

O

Notes
  OSA is common IATA code for Kansai International Airport , Osaka International Airport  and Kobe Airport .

References

  - includes IATA codes
 
 Aviation Safety Network - IATA and ICAO airport codes
 Great Circle Mapper - IATA, ICAO and FAA airport codes

O